Empire Curlew was a   ferry that was built in 1945 as LST Mk.3 HMS LST 3042 by Harland & Wolff, Govan, Scotland for the Royal Navy. In 1947, she was renamed HMS Hunter. During the Suez Crisis in 1956, she was transferred to the Ministry of Transport and renamed Empire Curlew. She served until 1962, when she was scrapped.

Description
The ship was built in 1945 by Harland & Wolff, Govan. She was Yard Number 1298,

The ship was propelled by a triple expansion steam engine. The engine was built by Lobnitz, Renfrew.

In Royal Navy service, the ship had a complement of 14 and capacity for 90 troops. Armament was 8 x 20mm AA guns.

History
HMS LST 3042 was launched on 31 January 1945, and completed in November 1945. She was commissioned on 16 November 1945. In 1947, she was renamed HMS Hunter. Hunter was later laid up on the River Clyde.

In 1956, during the Suez Crisis, she was requisitioned by the Ministry of Transport and renamed Empire Curlew. She was converted by John Brown & Company at their Dalmuir yard. She was placed under the management of the Atlantic Steam Navigation Company. She arrived 20 August 1962 at La Spezia, Italy for scrapping.

References

External links
Photo of HMS LST 3042
Photo of Empire Curlew

1945 ships
Ships built in Govan
LST (3)-class tank landing ships
Empire ships
Steamships of the United Kingdom
Merchant ships of the United Kingdom
Ferries of the United Kingdom
Ships built by Harland and Wolff